Anita Gale, Baroness Gale (born 28 November 1940) is a Labour Party member of the House of Lords.

As a Labour Party member, Gale became involved in women's issues in the Women's Section of the party. From 1976 to 1999 she worked full-time for the Labour Party, first as the Women's Officer for Wales, and from 1984 as the General Secretary for Wales - retiring from the post in 1999, and was appointed a life peer on 4 August 1999 as Baroness Gale, of Blaenrhondda in the County of Mid Glamorgan.

She has held the roles of Chair of the All Party Parliamentary group on Parkinson's, president of the National Association of Old Age Pensioners, Wales, and president of the Treherbert and District branch of the British Legion.

In 2010 she became Opposition Front Bench spokesperson on Wales and Equalities.

Gale is the grand-niece of the rugby league footballer who played in the 1900s and 1910s for Wales, Treherbert RLFC, and Hull FC; David Galloway.

References

1940 births
Living people
Life peeresses created by Elizabeth II
Gale of Blaenrhondda
Labour Friends of Israel